Major General Edward William Derrington Bell,  (18 May 1824 – 10 November 1879) was a British Army officer and a recipient of the Victoria Cross, the highest award for gallantry in the face of the enemy that can be awarded to British and Commonwealth forces.

Military career
Bell was the son of General Edward Wells Bell and entered the Royal Military College, Sandhurst, in 1838 at the age of 14. He was commissioned into the British Army in 1842 and was posted to Canada. He was promoted to captain in December 1848 and, during the Crimean War, was present at the Battles of Alma and Inkerman and the Siege of Sebastopol.

Bell was 30 years old, and a captain in the 23rd Regiment of Foot (later The Royal Welch Fusiliers) during the Crimean War when the following deed took place for which he was awarded the Victoria Cross (VC).

Bell was also awarded the Legion of Honour by the French, and the Turkish War Medal. Posted to India during the Indian Mutiny in 1857, he was present at the Siege of Lucknow. After India, he commanded the 2nd Battalion of the Royal Welch Fusiliers for the next 12 years until 1872, achieving the rank of major general in 1868. His last command was in Belfast, where he died in 1879.

Personal life
Bell is buried with his father in the churchyard at Kempsey, Worcestershire. He had married twice; firstly Alice Brooke, whom he divorced for her adultery, disowning her son, and secondly Charlotte Wadsworth (née Bartell), widow of surgeon John Davies, who was killed at the Alma, with whom he had a son and three daughters.

References

External links
 Location of grave and VC medal (Worcestershire)
  Major General Edward William Derrington Bell VC (grave details and brief biography)
 

1824 births
1879 deaths
People from Essex
Graduates of the Royal Military College, Sandhurst
Royal Welch Fusiliers officers
Crimean War recipients of the Victoria Cross
British Army personnel of the Crimean War
British Army major generals
British recipients of the Victoria Cross
Companions of the Order of the Bath
British military personnel of the Indian Rebellion of 1857
Chevaliers of the Légion d'honneur
British Army recipients of the Victoria Cross